Tony Burris is a former American football quarterback who played two seasons in the Arena Football League with the Detroit Drive and Washington Commandos. He played college football at Western Oregon State College.

References

External links
Just Sports Stats

Living people
Year of birth missing (living people)
American football quarterbacks
Western Oregon Wolves football players
Detroit Drive players
Washington Commandos players